The Perth River is a river in the Southern Alps in the West Coast region of New Zealand's South Island. Its source is in terrace icefields north of the Rangitata Divide and is joined by multiple tributaries, including a creek from Abel Lake. It features a number of rapids and passes through two gorges before meeting the Whataroa River. The river is largely inaccessible, but recently, an adventure tourism company has begun offering "heli-rafting" on the river: whitewater rafters are flown in by helicopter to raft the river.

Recreation
Kayakers have been flying ("heli-boating") up the Perth for a number of years. The normal rafting put-in at Five-Finger stream gives a nice class III-IV run with one amazing gorge. By flying up to Scone Hut, the trip becomes one of the best IV-V runs on the coast. More recently paddlers have been flying or walking upstream of scone hut for some V-V+ excitement.

The Perth River valley track is an advanced tramping route along the valley. The full out and back route takes three or more days and provides access to a large area of Department of Conservation land. The route has two backcountry huts, Nolans Hut and Scone Hut.

Conservation
Zero Invasive Predators Ltd (ZIP) established a pest control programme in the Perth River Valley in 2015. The programme has effectively eradicated all pest in the valley.

References

Westland District
Rivers of the West Coast, New Zealand
Rivers of New Zealand